The Seneca Road Company was formed to improve the main road running west from Utica, New York, the Genesee Road, from Utica to Canandaigua and operate it as a toll road or turnpike. The road was originally laid out in 1794 from Baggs Square in downtown Utica (then Old Fort Schuyler) at the ford of the Mohawk River and followed the Indian trail past Syracuse to Canandaigua. Some accounts say it went to Geneva and Avon originally. There was no City of Syracuse then.

On April 1, 1800, the privately held Seneca Road Company received a state charter with a capitalization of $110,000. This was a stock company with prominent local investors including Jedediah Sanger, Benjamin Walker, John Kirkland, and Wilhelmus Mynderss.

Completed to Canandaigua by 1808, it reached Buffalo in 1813.

Other state stipulations were
 four horses be used per coach
 a maximum of 12 passengers per coach
 speed of 
 coaches also carry U.S. Mail.

The road quickly led to the building of many hotels and inns along the route and was a catalyst of commerce.

Toll gates were at  intervals.  The company was profitable and paid dividends of 10 percent for 30 years.  Competition from newly constructed railroads in the late 1830s reduced traffic. 

In 1846, with revenues insufficient to maintain the turnpike, the company concluded it could no longer compete and be profitable. It surrendered its charter back to New York State thus ending the private phase of the Seneca Turnpike. The company was dissolved and the roadway reverted to a public road. The roadway is still in existence as part of New York State Route 5 and is still called the Seneca Turnpike or Old Seneca Turnpike in some places.

References

History of New York (state)
Turnpikes in New York (state)
Streets in Syracuse, New York